Lilium 'Navona' is an Asiatic lily hybrid variety of white lilies, used in cutflower production worldwide.

Description

It has big upward-facing, white flowers, with dark green foliage, that flower from late spring to early summer.
They can grow up to 26"-32" / 66.0 cm - 81.3 cm high.

History

It was created by Gebr. Vletter and Den Haan in Rijnsburg, The Netherlands, in the eighties.

Cultivation
It is hardy to between USDA Zone 3 and Zone 9.

It prefers positions in full sun or partial shade, in well-drained soils.

It can be grown in containers.

References

Navona
Ornamental plant cultivars